Injury Prevention is a bimonthly peer-reviewed medical journal covering the prevention of injuries in all age groups, including child and adolescent injuries. It is published by the BMJ Group and its editor-in-chief is Roderick J. McClure (University of New England). The journal is abstracted and indexed by CINAHL, MEDLINE,  Scopus, and the Science Citation Index Expanded. According to the Journal Citation Reports, the journal has a 2021 impact factor of 3.780.

References

External links
 
 International Society for Child and Adolescent Injury Prevention
 Society for Advancement of Violence and Injury Research

Bimonthly journals
BMJ Group academic journals
Publications established in 1995
English-language journals
Academic journals associated with international learned and professional societies
Injury prevention journals